Wilhelm-Ferdinand "Wutz" Galland (23 October 1914 – 17 August 1943) was a German Luftwaffe military aviator and fighter ace during World War II. He is credited with 55 aerial victories achieved in 186 combat missions. All his victories were claimed over the Western Front and in Defense of the Reich. This figure included seven four-engine bombers and 37 Supermarine Spitfire fighters.

Born in Bochum, Galland grew up in the Weimar Republic and Nazi Germany. He joined the military service in the Wehrmacht in 1935, initially serving with the anti-aircraft artillery of the Luftwaffe. Upon his request in late 1940, he transferred to the Jagdwaffe (fighter force). Following flight training, he was posted to Jagdgeschwader 26 "Schlageter" (JG 26—26th Fighter Wing) in June 1941. Flying with this wing, Galland claimed his first aerial victory on 23 July 1941 on the Western Front over a Royal Air Force fighter aircraft. He was made Staffelkapitän (squadron leader) of 5. Staffel (5th squadron) of JG 26 in May 1942 and in January 1943, Gruppenkommandeur (group commander) of II. Gruppe of JG 26. Following his 34th aerial victory, he was nominated and awarded the Knight's Cross of the Iron Cross on 18 May 1943. Galland claimed his last aerial victory on 12 August 1943. On 17 August 1943, during the Schweinfurt-Regensburg mission, he was killed in action following combat with Republic P-47 Thunderbolt fighters from the 56th Fighter Group.

Early life and career
Galland was born on 23 October 1914 in Bochum in the Province of Westphalia. The family with French Huguenot ancestry, had settled in Westerholt in 1792. Galland was the third of four sons of Adolf Galland (senior) and his French wife Anna, née Schipper. Upholding the family tradition, Galland (senior) worked as the land manager or bailiff to the Count von Westerholt. Galland's two older brothers were Fritz and Adolf and his younger brother was Paul. Their father had pet names for all his family members. His wife Anna was called "Anita". Fritz was called "Toby", Adolf was "Keffer", Wilhelm-Ferdinand was nicknamed "Wutz" and Paul was called "Paulinchen" or since they were expecting a girl, occasionally "Paula". All four Galland brothers later served in the Luftwaffe.

World War II
World War II in Europe began on Friday 1 September 1939 when German forces invaded Poland. At the time, Galland served with Flak-Lehr-Regiment, an anti-aircraft artillery training regiment, and participated in the Battle of France. In late 1940, he began flight training. On 27 June 1941, Galland completed his supplementary fighter pilot training with the Ergänzungsgruppe (a training unit) of JG 26 "Schlageter" and was then posted to II. Gruppe of JG 26. JG 26 was named after Albert Leo Schlageter, a martyr cultivated by the Nazi Party. Flying with 6. Staffel (6th squadron), Galland claimed his first aerial victory on 23 July 1941 in defense of a Royal Air Force (RAF) "Circus" mission flown by No. 11 Group. He shot down a Supermarine Spitfire fighter northwest of Hesdin, which according to Caldwell was unconfirmed. He filed his second claim on 27 September following combat with Spitfires in the vicinity of Boulogne. That day, the RAF flew two "Circus" missions, No. 103A attacking the Amiens motor yards, and No. 103B, targeting the Mazingarbe power station. On 6 November, Galland claimed a Royal Australian Air Force (RAAF) Spitfire from No. 452 Squadron shot down in the area of Calais, his last claim in 1941.

On 28 March 1943, the RAF conducted a "Rodeo" fighter sweeps over enemy territory. In its defense, II. Gruppe was called to action when an attack on Boulogne was imminent. The Hornchurch Wing engaged the Stab (headquarters unit) and I. Gruppe of JG 26 over Guînes and the English Channel while the Kenley Wing lead by Group Captain Victor Beamish encountered II. Gruppe between Cap Gris-Nez and Calais. In this aerial battle, JG 26 lost two aircraft and claimed six RAF fighters shot down, including Beamish who was killed in action. Galland accounted for one of the six German claims, taking his total to four aerial victories. He was credited with shooting down a Spitfire at 18:50 in the vicinity of Cap Gris-Nez. On 10 April, the RAF flew two "Rodeos", providing a diversion for a "Ramrod" short range bomber attack missions targeting Boulogne. That day, Galland flew with the Gruppenstab under the command of Hauptmann Joachim Müncheberg. JG 26 lost three aircraft, including two pilots killed in action, for six aerial victories claimed. His sixth claim was filed on 24 April following combat in defense of "Circus" No. 132. That day, the RAF targeted oil installations at Vlissingen and Walcheren in the Netherlands. II. Gruppe took off from Abbeville, headed for Cap Gris-Nez and attacked No. 234 Squadron, shooting down four Spitfires. One victory was credited to Galland who shot down a Spitfire near Cap d'Albert. On 1 May, four "Rodeos" and "Circus" No. 150 attacked various targets in northern France. II. Gruppe engaged the Hornchurch and North Weald Wing. During this encounter, Galland shot down a Spitfire from either No. 122 or No. 222 Squadron in the vicinity of Dover.

Squadron leader
On 4 May 1942, Galland was transferred to 5. Staffel (5th squadron) of JG 26. There, Galland replaced Oberleutnant Wolfgang Kosse as squadron leader, at first as Staffelführer and later officially as Staffelkapitän. The next day, Galland claimed his eighth aerial victory, a No. 41 Squadron Spitfire providing escort for "Circus" No. 157's Douglas A-20 Havoc "Boston" bombers. On the early morning of 2 June, the RAF flew a "Roadstead"—a low-level attack on coastal shipping—over the Somme Estuary, supported by two "Rodeos" heading for Saint-Omer. II. Gruppe was scrambled and encountered Spitfires from No. 64 and No. 222 Squadron over the Somme Estuary. In the resulting aerial battle, Galland claimed two Spitfires shot down at 07:10 and 07:18 respectively. On 20 June, II. Gruppe was called to action against "Circus" No. 193 targeting Le Havre. At 15:46, Galland accounted for a No. 118 or No. 501 Squadron Spitfire claimed in the area of Guînes. Galland claimed two further Spitfires shot down west-northwest of the Somme Estuary on 31 July. His opponents were fighters from either No. 121 or No. 332 Squadron.

During the Dieppe Raid on 19 August, 5. Staffel headed by Galland was scrambled from Abbeville at 06:30. At 06:43, 5. Staffel engaged fighters from the Hornchurch Wing, claiming one Spitfire shot down. At 07:49, Galland led his Staffel on the second mission of the day and encountered fighters from the North Weald Wing just north Dieppe. At 07:55, Galland was credited with the destruction of a Spitfire, the aircraft coming from either No. 242, No. 331 or No. 332 Squadron. In the afternoon, Galland led a flight of four Fw 190 to Dieppe. Taking off at Abbeville at 17:24, Galland found the combat zone at Dieppe deserted and spotted a small steamer laying offshore. Galland ordered a strafing run which exploded the ship. He then spotted another vessel which tried to escape north but was also sunk by strafing gunfire. He claimed his 15th aerial victory on 27 August over a Spitfire from the No. 350 (Belgian) Squadron. 5. Staffel had been placed on cockpit-readiness and was scrambled at 13:32 to intercept the incoming fighters approaching at low altitude. Galland's opponent was shot down at 13:45 northwest of the Somme Estuary. The next day, he claimed a Royal Canadian Air Force (RCAF) Spitfire from No. 401 Squadron east of Amiens.

The United States Army Air Forces (USAAF) VIII Bomber Command, later renamed to Eighth Air Force, had begun its regular combat operations on 17 August 1942. On 5 September, VIII Bomber Command targeted the Port of Le Havre and the Sotteville-lès-Rouen railroad yards, escorted by RAF Spitfire fighters from No. 64 and 340 (Free French) Squadron. At 11:35, Galland claimed one of the six Spitfires shot down by JG 26 that day. On 12 October, credited with 17 aerial victories, he was awarded the Honor Goblet of the Luftwaffe. Three days later, 5. Staffel encountered twenty Spitfires from No. 122 and No. 453 Squadron between Fécamp and Le Havre, one of which was shot down by Galland. On 31 October, Galland's younger brother Paul, who also served as a fighter pilot in JG 26, was killed in action.

On 15 December 1942, II. and III. Gruppe began experimenting with the then new Messerschmitt Bf 109 G-4 variant. Among other changes to earlier variants, it featured GM-1 nitrous oxide 'boost' for its Daimler-Benz DB 605 engine giving it an advantage to contemporary RAF fighters at higher altitude. II. Gruppe was scheduled to be fully reequipped with the Bf 109 G-4 in early 1943. However, Gruppenkommandeur (group commander) Hauptmann Conny Meyer, and later Galland, stalled the transition, retaining their Focke-Wulf Fw 190 fighters until the decision was revoked, as they believed the Fw 190 to be superior and more versatile to the Bf 109. Galland claimed his 21st and last aerial victory of 1942 on 31 December 1942. On New Year's Eve, he shot down a Spitfire from No. 306 Polish Fighter Squadron north-northwest of the Somme Estuary.

Group commander and death
On 2 January 1943, Galland was appointed Gruppenkommandeur of II. Gruppe of JG 26 by his brother General der Jagdflieger (General of the Fighter Arm) Adolf Galland. General Galland had been unhappy for some time about the JG 26's lack of success against the USAAF strategic aerial bombardment campaign. In consequence, the former Gruppenkommandeur Meyer was transferred to a training unit and Wilhelm-Ferdinand appointed his successor. Galland claimed his first aerial victory in 1943 over a Spitfire from the 340 (Free French) Squadron on 9 January. That day, the RAF targeted the Abbeville-Drucat airfield. On 13 January, Galland mistakenly shot down and killed Unteroffizier Johann Irlinger from 6. Staffel over the Abbeville airfield. Galland had misidentified the Bf 109 G-4 as a Spitfire. On 22 January, Galland led his Gruppe in a mission against an RAF "Circus" consisting of a flight of A-20 "Boston" bombers escorted by numerous Spitfire fighters. In this engagement, Galland was credited with the destruction of a No. 350 (Belgian) Squadron Spitfire shot down west-northwest of Gravelines. Four days later, II. Gruppe faced Spitfires from No. 64 and No. 306 Polish Fighter Squadron, resulting in another victory over a Spitfire. His 24th aerial victory was claimed near Watten. This resulted in the presentation of the German Cross in Gold on 28 January 1943, which he received for 24 aerial victories.

On 8 March, VIII Bomber Command attacked Rennes with 54 Boeing B-17 Flying Fortress bombers and Rouen railroad yards with 16 Consolidated B-24 Liberator bombers. While Major Josef Priller and his flight attacked the escort fighters, Galland led his 24 Fw 190 fighters in a head-on attack on the B-24 bomber formation from the 44th Bombardment Group. Without damage or loss to the Fw 190 fighters, four B-24 bombers were claimed, one of which by Galland, shot down near Tôtes. According to Weal, this was the only time a Luftwaffe unit forced the USAAF bombers to turn back before reaching their target. On 17 April, Galland claimed a North American P-51 Mustang fighter. Since no P-51 fighters were involved, it is possible that his opponent was a misidentified No. 56 Squadron Hawker Typhoon which crashed after engine failure. On 21 April, Galland led his flight against eleven Lockheed Ventura medium bombers from No. 21 Squadron RAF attacking the Abbeville railroad yards. In this encounter, Galland was credited with the destruction of two Ventura bombers. He was awarded the Knight's Cross of the Iron Cross on 18 May 1943. The nomination had been submitted following his 34th aerial victory. The presentation was made at the Vitry airfield by Generalfeldmarschall (Field Marshal) Hugo Sperrle.

In the late afternoon on 4 July, RAF North American B-25 Mitchell bombers attacked Amiens. To counter this attack, Jagdfliegerführer 2, among other units, dispatched II. Gruppe of JG 26 headed by Galland. The Gruppe claimed four aerial victories over the escorting fighters, including a Spitfire shot down by Galland, for the loss of one pilot killed in action. On 9 July, Galland had just been promoted to Major (major), and claimed another Spitfire shot down. This combat occurred over Boulogne and was in defense of "Ramrod" 127. RAF Y-stations recorded the communications of this encounter. Both sides claimed one aerial victory each with no aircraft lost on either side. Galland shot down two Republic P-47 Thunderbolt fighters from the 78th Fighter Group on 14 July. The next day, he accounted for another P-47 and a "Boston" bomber, both claimed over or near the Somme Estuary. On 30 July 1943, the day marked the end of "Blitz Week", the USAAF targeted the Fieseler aircraft manufacturing factories located in Kassel. To counter this attack, Luftflotte 3 (3rd Air Fleet) dispatched eleven fighter groups, among them II. Gruppe of JG 26 lead by Galland. On this mission, Galland claimed a B-17 bomber shot down east of Apeldoorn. On 12 August, the USAAF flew bombing missions against the Ruhr and Rheine area. In defense of this attack, Galland claimed his last aerial victory, a B-17 bomber. This claim in the vicinity of Siegburg was in fact an Herausschuss (separation shot)—a severely damaged heavy bomber forced to separate from its combat box which was counted as an aerial victory.

Unteroffizier Heinz Gomann, Galland's wingman on this mission, had yelled out a warning too late. Galland disappeared after the first P-47 attack. His body, still in his aircraft, was found two months later north of Liège. II. Gruppe took off on a bomber intercept mission and engaged the B-17 bomber formation but the German aircraft were intercepted by escorting P-47 fighters from the 56th Fighter Group, USAAF, under command of Colonel Hubert Zemke. It is assumed that Galland was shot down by the American fighter pilot Walker "Bud" Mahurin of the 56th Fighter Group. Galland was temporarily succeeded by Hauptmann Johannes Naumann until Oberstleutnant Johannes Seifert took command on II. Gruppe on 9 September.

Summary of career

Aerial victory claims
Mathews and Foreman, authors of Luftwaffe Aces: Biographies and Victory Claims, researched the German Federal Archives and found records for 56 aerial victory claims, all of which were claimed on the Western Front and include eight four-engined bombers.

Awards
 Honour Goblet of the Luftwaffe (Ehrenpokal der Luftwaffe) on 12 October 1942 as Oberleutnant and Staffelkapitän
 German Cross in Gold on 28 January 1943 as Hauptmann in the II./Jagdgeschwader 26
 Knight's Cross of the Iron Cross on 18 May 1943 as Hauptmann and Gruppenkommandeur of the II./Jagdgeschwader 26 "Schlageter"

Notes

References

Citations

Bibliography

 
 
 
 
 
 
 
 
 
 
 
 
 
 
 
 
 
 
 

1914 births
1943 deaths
Luftwaffe personnel killed in World War II
German World War II flying aces
Luftwaffe pilots
Recipients of the Gold German Cross
Recipients of the Knight's Cross of the Iron Cross
Aviators killed by being shot down
People from the Province of Westphalia
Burials at Lommel German war cemetery
Military personnel from Bochum